In the Tall Grass is a 2019 Canadian supernatural horror drama film written and directed by Vincenzo Natali. It is based on Stephen King and Joe Hill's 2012 novella of the same name. It stars Harrison Gilbertson, Laysla De Oliveira, Avery Whitted, Will Buie Jr., Rachel Wilson, and Patrick Wilson.

The project was in initial development in early 2015, and went forward in May 2018, when streaming service Netflix announced that it had purchased the film rights, setting Natali to direct and adapt the screenplay. Principal photography took place in summer 2018 in Toronto, Ontario.

The film had its world premiere at Fantastic Fest on September 20, 2019, and was released on Netflix on October 4, 2019. It received mixed reviews from critics, with many praising the performances, atmosphere and faithfulness to the novella, but criticizing its inconsistent tone and dialogue.

Plot

Siblings Becky,  who is 6 months pregnant, and Cal DeMuth are travelling to San Diego. Midway there, they hear a young boy, Tobin, calling for help from a field of tall grass. His mother, Natalie, shuts him up. Concerned, the siblings enter but quickly get separated and find that their distance changes unnaturally. Panicked, they decide to leave but can't find the road. Becky encounters Tobin's father Ross, who tells her to stay with him and not to lose sight of him but she unfortunately ends up losing him. Cal stumbles across a bruised, dirty Tobin holding a dead crow. Tobin claims the grass won't move dead things and buries the bird in the path and then he tells Cal that Becky will die soon and that the rock told him that. When Tobin leads Cal to a rock in the field and tells him to touch it, interrupted by Becky's scream, he is attacked by a ghost.

The father of Becky's child, Travis, arrives looking for her and Cal. He investigates the field, stumbling across Tobin, implying that they are acquaintances, leading him to Becky's corpse. Tobin arrives at a nearby church with his parents. Hearing Travis, who is now calling out to Tobin, their dog Freddy runs into the grass, and the family runs in after him, where Travis hears Tobin and looks for him. The family panics, with Ross stumbling across the rock and touching it. Becky and Cal re-enter the grass as Tobin states that Freddy died. Knowing the grass's trait, Travis, Becky and Cal move towards Tobin, and all four find each other. Travis tells Becky and Cal that they had been missing for two months. It is also revealed that Travis originally was not interested in being a father and asked Becky to abort their baby, which she refused. As a result, Becky and Cal were traveling to San Diego to meet a family interested in adopting her baby when it was born as she did not feel ready to be a single parent. Travis expresses regret at his actions and now wants to be part of his child and Becky's lives.

The group spots a building in the distance. Becky receives a phone call from someone warning them not to keep making the same "mistake". The grass seemingly enters Becky's uterus, and she passes out, only to be revived by Ross, who then reunites with Tobin and says he'll show them out. Ross leads them to the rock where they are confronted by Natalie, she warns them not to touch the rock. Then, she claims she saw Becky's corpse earlier.  Natalie warns that Ross is dangerous, and the others decide to leave. Travis attacks Ross who then breaks his arm and crushes Natalie's head. Ross claims the rock showed him the truth and the way out, but he doesn't want to leave.

Becky, Cal, Travis, and Tobin reach the building, and while scouting, Travis and Cal discover that Freddy has managed to escape the field via a "hole" that leads to the road. Jealous Cal, implied to have incestuous feelings for Becky, lets go of Travis as he slips, causing him to fall off the roof. Tobin flees into the field when Ross follows them to the roof. The two follow Tobin, but Becky refuses to leave Travis and goes back as Cal flees, Cal is strangled to death by Ross. It is revealed they are in a time loop, with Cal permanently being hunted by an insane, possessed Ross in the grass. Travis survives and searches for Becky. Becky says the baby will be fostered.

Becky is attacked by Ross but escapes by stabbing him in the eye, and a thunderstorm begins. Becky is confronted by Grass Creatures, who carry her to the rock, which has prophetic marks relating to her pregnancy. Becky makes a phone call, pleading for her past self to prevent Cal from hurting Travis. As she screams in pain from contractions, the ground underneath the rock opens, revealing multiple roots that turn into humanoid figures reaching towards her. She passes out and wakes up to Cal who squeezes water into her mouth. He is holding her baby. She goes back to sleep and wakes up to Cal feeding her baby to her and telling her it is just grass and seeds. Becky realizes that "Cal" is Ross. Tobin finds Travis and tells him that Ross killed both the baby and Cal, and is going to keep killing them over and over. They are confronted by Ross, who mortally wounds Travis. As Ross attempts to force Tobin to touch the rock, Becky attacks him and scratches out his other eye, before dying from her wounds. Travis kills Ross. To understand, Travis touches the rock and sees strange visuals. He grabs Tobin's hand and guides him to an exit, instructing him to stop Becky and Cal from entering.

Tobin emerges across the road as Becky and Cal are about to enter the grass, convincing them to stay out by showing them Becky's necklace that Travis gave him, hence closing the loop. Becky decides to keep her baby as they drive back home. Travis listens to them leaving and dies.

Cast
 Harrison Gilbertson as Travis McKean
 Laysla De Oliveira as Becky DeMuth
 Avery Whitted as Cal DeMuth
 Will Buie Jr. as Tobin Humboldt
Rachel Wilson as Natalie Humboldt
Patrick Wilson as Ross Humboldt

Production

Development
Director Vincenzo Natali had wanted to make a film adaptation of Stephen King and Joe Hill's short story In the Tall Grass as early as 2015, when he stated:

On May 7, 2018, it was announced that Netflix would adopt the short story, with Natali hired to write and direct, and Steve Hoban, Jimmy Miller, and M. Riley producing.

On May 28, 2018, Natali announced that manga artist Shintaro Kago would design the concept art for the film adaptation.

Casting
Alongside the initial production announcement, it was reported that James Marsden was in negotiations for a lead role. On August 7, 2018, it was announced that Marsden had bowed out of the film due to scheduling conflicts and been replaced with Patrick Wilson. Additionally, it was reported that Laysla De Oliveira, Harrison Gilbertson, Avery Whitted, Rachel Wilson, and Will Buie Jr. had also joined the cast.

Filming
Principal photography was expected to begin on July 30, 2018, and last until September 14, 2018, in Toronto, Ontario. On July 24, 2018, it was reported that a dilapidated church set had been constructed for the film on a rural road in Perth South, Ontario. On September 20, 2018, filming took place outside of a bowling alley in Elmira, Ontario.

Release
The film had its world premiere at Fantastic Fest on September 20, 2019. On October 4, 2019, the film began streaming on Netflix.

Reception

Accolades
The film was nominated for Best Streaming Premiere at the 2020 Fangoria Chainsaw Awards.

References

External links
 
 
 

2019 films
2019 horror films
2010s horror drama films
English-language Canadian films
Canadian horror drama films
Canadian supernatural horror films
Films shot in Toronto
Films based on American horror novels
Films based on works by Stephen King
Films directed by Vincenzo Natali
Films scored by Mark Korven
Films with screenplays by Vincenzo Natali
Incest in film
English-language Netflix original films
2010s pregnancy films
Time loop films
2019 drama films
Folk horror films
Films based on short fiction
Films set in San Diego
2010s English-language films
2010s Canadian films
Copperheart Entertainment films